The Midland M16, also known as the Spyker M16, was the car with which the Midland team competed in the  Formula One season.  It was driven by Tiago Monteiro, who had driven for the team in  during its Jordan guise, and Christijan Albers, who moved from Minardi.

Although Eddie Jordan had sold his team prior to the start of the 2005 season, 2006 marked the first year for the team under the Midland banner.  However, team owner Alex Shnaider would soon become frustrated with the vagaries of being a tail-ending team, and sold it to Spyker Cars just before the Italian GP.  The cars' livery accordingly changed from red-and-grey to Dutch orange-and-silver, but the team was called Spyker MF1 Racing as a compromise to its sponsors.

On the circuit, the car was a definite improvement on the Jordan EJ15, but it was not enough considering other teams' advances. Despite this, Albers put in some strong showings in the latter stages of the season, and generally outperformed Monteiro, who lost his excellent 2005 reliability record.

By the end of the year, the focus was on 2007 with Spyker's full support, a new driver and Ferrari engines, replacing the Toyota units.

The team were unclassified in the Constructors' Championship, with no points.

Sponsors:
rhino's,
Toyota,
Bridgestone,
JVC,
Mingya.cn,
ZIM,
Superfund,
TrekStor,
Midland Group,
Spyker (from Chinese GP onwards)

Complete Formula One results
(key) (results in bold indicate pole position)

References

Formula One cars
2006 Formula One season cars